William Shakespeare's Star Wars is a series of novels by Ian Doescher that parody the style of William Shakespeare, with nine installments adapting the films of the Skywalker Saga. The novels are written as closet dramas, mixing blank verse poetry and stage scripts with Early Modern English stock characters and orthography.

The original trilogy

William Shakespeare's Star Wars: Verily, a New Hope (2013)
 based on Star Wars: Episode IV – A New Hope
William Shakespeare's The Empire Striketh Back: Star Wars Part the Fifth (2014)
 based on Star Wars: Episode V – The Empire Strikes Back 
William Shakespeare's The Jedi Doth Return: Star Wars Part the Sixth (2014)
 based on Star Wars: Episode VI – Return of the Jedi 
All three volumes were subsequently released as William Shakespeare's Star Wars Trilogy: The Royal Box Set.

The prequel trilogy

 William Shakespeare's The Phantom of Menace: Star Wars Part the First (2015) 
 based on Star Wars: Episode I – The Phantom Menace 
 William Shakespeare's The Clone Army Attacketh: Star Wars Part the Second (2015)
 based on Star Wars: Episode II – Attack of the Clones
 William Shakespeare's Tragedy of the Sith's Revenge: Star Wars Part the Third (2015)
 based on Star Wars: Episode III – Revenge of the Sith

The sequel trilogy

 William Shakespeare's The Force Doth Awaken: Star Wars Part the Seventh (2017)
 based on Star Wars: The Force Awakens 
 William Shakespeare's Jedi the Last: Star Wars Part the Eighth (2018)
 based on Star Wars: The Last Jedi
 William Shakespeare’s The Merry Rise of Skywalker: Star Wars Part the Ninth (2020)
 based on Star Wars: The Rise of Skywalker

See also
 Shakespeare and Star Trek
 Shakespeare's influence

Books based on Star Wars
Plays based on films
William Shakespeare
Science fiction theatre
Fantasy theatre
Quirk Books books